Mathematics is a semi-monthly peer-reviewed open-access scientific journal that covers all aspects of mathematics. It publishes theoretical and experimental research articles, short communications, and reviews. It was established in 2013 and is published by MDPI. The editor-in-chief is Francisco Chiclana (De Montfort University).

Abstracting and indexing
The journal is abstracted and indexed in:
Current Contents/Physical, Chemical & Earth Sciences
EBSCO databases
Metadex
ProQuest databases
Science Citation Index Expanded
Scopus
zbMATH Open (from 2013 to 2018)
According to the Journal Citation Reports, the journal has a 2021 impact factor of 2.592.

References

External links

English-language journals
MDPI academic journals
Mathematics journals
Publications established in 2013
Semi-monthly journals